Johannes Voggenhuber (born 5 June 1950) is an Austrian politician and former  Member of the European Parliament (MEP) for the Austrian Green Party, which is part of the European Greens.  He was vice president of the Parliament's Constitutional Affairs Committee.

From 1982 to 1987, he was member of the city council in Salzburg. From 1988 to 1992, he was federal spokesman for the Austrian Greens, and between 1990 and 1996, Member of the National Council of Austria (Nationalrat). From 1995 to 2009 he was Member of the European Parliament.

He is married and has two children.

Notes and references

External links
 

1950 births
Living people
The Greens – The Green Alternative MEPs
MEPs for Austria 1996–1999
MEPs for Austria 1999–2004
MEPs for Austria 2004–2009